Jiří Bičák (born 1942) is a Czech physicist currently at Charles University, fellow of the American Physical Society and formerly a President of the Learned Society of the Czech Republic.

References

External Links
 http://utf.mff.cuni.cz/info/lide/bicak.html

1942 births
Living people
Academic staff of Charles University
Czech physicists